Kawda Machan Alice is a 2013 Sri Lankan Sinhala comedy film directed by Lesli Siriwardana and co-produced by Raj Ranasinghe and Ashok Ranasinghe. It stars Wimal Kumara de Costa and Ronnie Leitch in lead roles along with Wilson Gunaratne and Samanthi Lenarol. Music composed by Somapala Rathnayake. It is the 1193rd Sri Lankan film in the Sinhala cinema.

Cast
 Wimal Kumara de Costa
 Ronnie Leitch
 Wilson Gunaratne
 Samanthi Lenarol
 Harshani Perera
 Evon Goh
 Arshad Ahamad
 Senarath Gunasekara
 Indika Rathanayaka
 Ayesha Frenando
 Thariya Kenadi

References

2013 films
2010s Sinhala-language films